Seaford Union Free School District is a public school district based in Seaford, New York in the United States. , the school district has 2,202 students enrolled.

The Seaford Union Free School District includes Seaford Manor Elementary, Seaford Harbor Elementary, Seaford Middle School, and Seaford High School. The District encompasses 82 square miles in lower Delaware and includes the communities of Seaford and Blades.

In 2017 Adele Pecora became the superintendent. She previously worked for the Commack School District and the Island Tree School District.

See also
 List of school districts in New York

References

External links
 

School districts in New York (state)
Education in Nassau County, New York